William Wirt Culbertson (September 22, 1835 – October 31, 1911) was a U.S. Representative from Kentucky.

Biography
He was born near Lewistown, Pennsylvania on September 22, 1835. Culbertson moved with his parents to Kentucky, where attended the common schools.
He engaged in the manufacture of iron.
Enlisted as a private in the Union Army in Company F, Twenty-seventh Regiment, Ohio Volunteer Infantry, July 16, 1861.
He was promoted to the rank of captain August 2, 1861.
He resigned March 3, 1864.
He served as member of the State house of representatives in 1870.
He served in the State senate in 1873.
He served as delegate to the Republican National Convention in 1876, 1880, and 1884.
He served as mayor of Ashland, Kentucky, in 1882 and 1883 when he resigned.

Culbertson was elected as a Republican to the Forty-eighth Congress (March 4, 1883 – March 3, 1885).

On July 30, 1884, Culbertson attempted suicide by firing five shots at the back of his head. Despite a grim prognosis, Culbertson survived the attempt to take his own life.

He died in Oxford, Ohio, on October 31, 1911, and was interred in Ashland Cemetery in Ashland, Kentucky.

Notes and references

1835 births
1911 deaths
Mayors of Ashland, Kentucky
Union Army officers
Republican Party members of the Kentucky House of Representatives
Republican Party Kentucky state senators
Republican Party members of the United States House of Representatives from Kentucky
19th-century American politicians